The 2011 Michigan Wolverines football team, sometimes known as Team 132 in reference to the 132-year tradition of the Michigan football program, represented the University of Michigan in the sport of college football during the 2011 NCAA Division I FBS football season.

Under first-year head coach Brady Hoke, Michigan compiled a record of 11–2 and finished in second place in the newly formed Legends Division of the Big Ten Conference.  Hoke, hired in January 2011 following the firing of previous head coach Rich Rodriguez, was named Big Ten Coach of the Year by both the media and the coaches and was a finalist for national coach of the year honors.  Highlights of Michigan's 2011 season included a 35–31 victory over Notre Dame in the first night game ever played at Michigan Stadium, a 45–17 victory over Nebraska in the Cornhuskers' first year in the Big Ten, and the first victory over arch-rival Ohio State since 2003.  Michigan's season ended with a 23–20 overtime victory against Virginia Tech in the 2012 Sugar Bowl.

Under first-year defensive coordinator Greg Mattison, Michigan's defense went from being ranked 107th in scoring defense in 2010 (35.2 points per game) to being ranked sixth (17.38 points per game) in 2011.  The team's leaders on defense included senior nose tackle Mike Martin, who started 29 consecutive games for Michigan, and safety Jordan Kovacs, who was a quarterfinalist for the Lott Trophy and a semifinalist for the Burlsworth Trophy.  Mattison was selected as one of five finalists for the 2011 Broyles Award, awarded to the best assistant coach in college football.

On offense, Michigan had two players, Denard Robinson and Fitzgerald Toussaint, rush for 1,000 yards each for the first time since 1975.  Robinson led the Big Ten in total offense per game for the second year in a row and also led the Wolverines in scoring with 96 points.  Place-kicker Brendan Gibbons was the team's second leading scorer with 93 points having converted 13 of 17 field goal attempts and 54 of 55 extra points.  Senior David Molk won the Rimington Trophy as the best center in college football and also became Michigan's first consensus All-American since 2007.  Junior Hemingway was the team's leading receiver with 699 receiving yards and led the conference in yards per reception (20.6) for the second year in a row.

Preseason
In 2010, Michigan became bowl eligible for the first time since 2007 and faced the Mississippi State Bulldogs in the Gator Bowl, which Michigan lost 52–14. The 2010 Wolverines finished the season ranked eighth nationally in total offense with quarterback Denard Robinson setting several individual records.  However, the defensive unit finished 110th in total defense.

On January 4, 2011, after Michigan's loss in the Gator Bowl, and following a 15–22 record in three seasons under head coach Rich Rodriguez, athletic director Dave Brandon announced that Rodriguez had been fired and a national search was underway to select a new head coach. Brady Hoke was hired as Michigan's new head coach on January 11. Hoke's hiring triggered speculation that Denard Robinson would transfer, as it was believed that Hoke would run a pro-style offense with Michigan's new offensive coordinator Al Borges, but Robinson announced one day after Hoke's hiring that he would return to Michigan for the 2011 season.  On defense, Michigan hired defensive coordinator Greg Mattison from the Baltimore Ravens. Mattison had previously been the defensive coordinator for Michigan's 1995 and 1996 teams. Following Hoke's hiring, the team was dubbed "Team 132" in recognition of the 132 seasons of Michigan football.

During the first eight months of 2011, seven Michigan players announced plans to transfer to other schools.  The first to go was backup quarterback Tate Forcier who announced on January 22 that he was leaving the team, having previously been declared academically ineligible for the Gator Bowl.  The other departures were (1) starting safety Ray Vinopal, who cited personal reasons for transferring to Pittsburgh, (2) cornerback Cullen Christian who also transferred to Pittsburgh, (3) wide receiver D.J. Williamson, (4) incoming offensive guard Tony Posada, (5) wide receiver Je'Ron Stokes who transferred to Bowling Green, and (6) incoming tight end Chris Barnett.

On August 7, 2011, Hoke announced that wide receiver Darryl Stonum (the team's second leading receiver in 2010) was suspended and would be redshirted due to drunken driving related violations.  Additionally, due to an unspecified team rules violations, punter Will Hagerup (who had been suspended for one game in 2010) was suspended for the first four games, while wide receiver Terrence Robinson was suspended for the first game.

On August 28, 2011, the team named tight end Kevin Koger, defensive tackle Mike Martin, and center David Molk as its co-captains for the 2011 season.  Michigan returned 17 of 22 starters from the 2010 team — ten on offense and seven on defense. In addition to Vinopal, Michigan was forced to replace starters offensive guard Stephen Schilling, linebacker Jonas Mouton, cornerback James Rogers, and defensive Greg Banks, as well as back-up linebacker Obi Ezeh, who was a former starter for the Wolverines. Other 2010 Wolverines in NFL training camps included Martell Webb and Perry Dorrestein.  A total of 26 former Wolverine student-athletes were on opening day 53-man NFL active rosters.

Six Michigan players were listed on preseason watch lists: (1) Denard Robinson for the Walter Camp Award (best college player), Maxwell Award (best offensive player), and Davey O'Brien Award (best quarterback), Paul Hornung Award (most versatile player), and Manning Award (best quarterback), (2) Mike Martin for the Bednarik Trophy (best defensive player), Outland Trophy (best interior lineman), and Lombardi Award (best lineman), (3) David Molk for the Outland Trophy, Lombardi Award, and Rimington Trophy (best center), (4) Kevin Koger for the John Mackey Award (best tight end), (5) Roy Roundtree for the Fred Biletnikoff Award (best wide receiver), and (6) Ryan Van Bergen for the Ted Hendricks Award (best defensive end).

Recruiting

Position key

Recruits
Michigan's recruiting class was ranked No. 27 by Scout and No. 21 by Rivals. It was not ranked by ESPN. The program received 20 letters of intent on National Signing Day, February 2, 2011.

Rankings

Michigan began the season unranked in the Top 25 of both the AP Poll and the Coaches' Poll, but by midseason had risen to #10 in the Coaches' Poll and #11 in the AP Poll. After its loss to Michigan State, Michigan fell to #17 in the Coaches' Poll and #18 in the AP Poll. Michigan rose to #13 in the AP and Coaches' Polls and #15 in the BCS Poll before its game against Iowa, falling after the loss to #22 in the AP Poll, #21 in the Coaches' Poll, and #24 in the BCS Poll. Michigan finished the regular season ranked #12 in the Coaches' Poll, and #13 in the AP and BCS Polls. Following its win over Virginia Tech in the Sugar Bowl, Michigan ended the season ranked #9 in the Coaches' Poll and #12 in the AP Poll.

*Source: ESPN.com: 2011 NCAA Football Rankings

Schedule

Radio
On August 8, 2011, the University of Michigan announced a five-year extension of its contract with CBS Radio.  Detroit's WWJ became the new flagship station. All games were broadcast by radio on the Michigan Wolverines Football Network and on Sirius XM Satellite Radio. The radio announcers were Frank Beckmann (play-by-play), Jim Brandstatter (color commentary), and Doug Karsch (sideline reports).

Game summaries

vs. Western Michigan

Sources:

In the opening game of the season, Michigan hosted the Western Michigan Broncos. When the teams last met in 2009, the Wolverines won 31–7.

In a game shortened by lightning, Michigan defeated Western Michigan 34–10. Western Michigan scored the only points of the first quarter with a one-yard touchdown run by Antoin Scriven. Michigan answered with three consecutive touchdowns in the second quarter: a one-yard run by Fitzgerald Toussaint, a 94-yard interception return by Brandon Herron (the longest interception return for a touchdown in Michigan program history), and a two-yard touchdown run by Toussaint.  Following Michigan's third touchdown, the extra point attempt was blocked.  The Broncos scored their final points of the game on a 36-yard field goal by John Potter just before halftime. In the third quarter, Herron returned a fumble 29 yards for a touchdown, and Michael Shaw scored on a 44-yard touchdown run (the longest touchdown run of his career). After two rain delays in the third quarter, the game was stopped due to lightning in the area and Michigan was awarded the win.  The temperature on the field at kickoff was over 137 °F, and by the end of the game it had dropped to 84 °F, a difference of 53 °F.  This was the first Michigan football game to be ended due to weather before all 60 minutes were played and the second game in Michigan Stadium history that featured a weather delay (the first coming in a 2006 game against Central Michigan).

Jordan Kovacs and Brandon Herron led the defense.  Kovacks forced the fumble that was returned for a touchdown, had two quarterback sacks and ten tackles, and was named the Lott Trophy's IMPACT Player of the Week.  Herron became the first Michigan player to post two defensive touchdowns and the first since Tom Harmon to have two return touchdowns of any kind in a game. In recognition of his efforts, Herron was named Big Ten Defensive Player of the Week, Walter Camp National Defensive Player of the Week, National Defensive Performer of Week 1 and National Linebacker Performer of the Week by College Football Performance Awards (CFPA), and Big Ten Defensive Player of the Week by College Sports Madness.  He was also nominated for Defensive Performance of the Year by Intersport.

The NCAA originally determined that it would not count player and team statistics for the game, because three quarters had not been completed.  At the end of November 2011, the NCAA reversed the decision and determined that statistics from the game would be counted.

vs. Notre Dame

Sources:
    
    
    
    
    
    
    
    
    
    

Following its opener against Western Michigan, Michigan renewed its rivalry with the Notre Dame Fighting Irish.  In the first night game in Michigan Stadium history, both teams wore "throwback-style" jerseys. Michigan's jerseys did not entirely match any worn in team history; however, they incorporated "design elements from different eras of Michigan football." During the previous meeting, Denard Robinson set a school record for total yardage in a single game at 502 yards, as Michigan defeated Notre Dame 28–24 in a wild affair. Due to the significance of the game, ESPN announced on August 5 that College GameDay would be held in Ann Arbor for the first time since November 17, 2007, when Michigan hosted Ohio State, which was Michigan head coach Lloyd Carr's final regular season game before he retired. At the game, 1991 Heisman Trophy winner Desmond Howard was honored in recognition of his recent induction into the College Football Hall of Fame. A 1991 consensus All-American, Howard became the first receiver in history to lead the Big Ten Conference in scoring, and he set or tied five NCAA records and 12 single-season Michigan records during his senior year. Charles Woodson was also honored. A C-47 conducted the pre-game flyover and two parachuters from the 101st Airborne Division entered the stadium at halftime.

Michigan came back from a 17-point deficit to defeat Notre Dame 35–31, scoring the winning touchdown with two seconds remaining. Notre Dame started the scoring with two consecutive touchdowns in the first quarter, with the first coming from a seven-yard catch by Theo Riddick, and the second from a four-yard run by Cierre Wood. Michigan's only points of the first half came on a 43-yard reception by Junior Hemingway in the second quarter. Notre Dame answered with a 38-yard field goal by David Ruffer just before halftime to extend its lead to ten points. The score at halftime was 17–7 in favor of Notre Dame. The only points of the third quarter were when Notre Dame's T. J. Jones caught a 15-yard touchdown pass. In the fourth quarter Michigan rallied from behind, scoring three consecutive touchdowns: first a one-yard run by Denard Robinson after Stephen Hopkins fumbled at the goal line, then a 47-yard catch by Jeremy Gallon, then a 21-yard catch by Vincent Smith to give them their first lead of the game. Notre Dame responded almost immediately, as Theo Riddick scored his second touchdown of the game less than a minute later on a 29-yard catch. Michigan received the ball on its 20-yard line with 30 seconds remaining, and drove 80 yards in 28 seconds with Roy Roundtree scoring the game-winning touchdown with two seconds left in the game.

Michigan's 17-point comeback against Notre Dame tied for the third-biggest comeback in Michigan history and tied for the second-biggest comeback at Michigan Stadium. The game's announced crowd of 114,804 set the all-time attendance record for a football game—college or NFL—and broke the Michigan Stadium attendance record. The previous Michigan Stadium record was 113,411 spectators, established at the 2010 "Big Chill at the Big House" ice hockey game. In recognition of his performance during the game, the Big Ten named Denard Robinson its Offensive Player of the Week, while the Davey O'Brien Award named him its Quarterback of the Week. He was also named Rivals.com's Big Ten and National Player of the Week and won the Capital One Cup Impact Performance of the Week. The team was recognized as the Tostitos Fiesta Bowl National Team of Week.

vs. Eastern Michigan

Sources:
 
    
    
    
    
    

In the third week of the season, Michigan hosted the Eastern Michigan Eagles. Michigan won the previous meeting between the two schools in 2009 by a 45–17 score.

Michigan defeated Eastern Michigan 31–3. In the first quarter, Eastern Michigan sustained five drives into Michigan territory, but their drives stalled on a fumble, an interception, and a stop by the Michigan defense on fourth down from the one-yard line. On the first play of the second quarter, the Eagles took a 3–0 lead on a 21-yard field goal by Kody Fulkerson.  Michigan did not score until the 9:28 mark in the second quarter with a nine-yard touchdown pass from Denard Robinson to Kevin Koger. The Wolverines added to the lead later in the second quarter on an 11-yard touchdown run by Robinson giving Michigan a 14–3 lead at halftime. In the third quarter, Michigan added two more touchdowns on a one-yard touchdown run by Fitzgerald Toussaint and a 19-yard touchdown catch by Drew Dileo. The final points of the game came on a 21-yard field goal by Brendan Gibbons in the fourth quarter.

In holding Eastern Michigan to three points, Michigan put in its best performance in scoring defense since a 38–0 shutout of Notre Dame on September 15, 2007. The defense also held the Eagles to 29 passing yards – the lowest total for a Michigan opponent since Rice recorded 15 passing yards in 1999.  Denard Robinson rushed for 198 yards. Robinson's 52-yard run early in the second quarter was his longest to that point of the season, later eclipsed by a 53-yard run against San Diego State. After Robinson completed seven of 18 passes with an interception, the Associated Press called it "another lackluster passing performance." Vincent Smith also contributed 118 rushing yards rushing on nine carries. The Wolverines improved to 10–0 in the all-time series against Eastern Michigan.

vs. San Diego State

Sources:

In its final game of non-conference play, Michigan hosted the San Diego State Aztecs. This meeting was the first between the two schools since 2004, and came nine months after Brady Hoke left San Diego State for Michigan. During the previous meeting, Michigan escaped a potential upset by San Diego State, winning 24–21.

Michigan defeated San Diego State 28–7. Denard Robinson scored all three touchdowns in the first half: a five-yard run and then a 53-yard run in the first quarter, and then in the second quarter on a one-yard run. In the third quarter, San Diego State scored its only points of the game with a 16-yard catch by Colin Lockett following a fumble by Michigan's Stephen Hopkins. In the fourth quarter, Michigan sealed its victory with a seven-yard touchdown run by Vincent Smith.

Robinson carried the ball 21 times for 200 yards and three touchdowns and also passed for 93 yards. It was Robinson's third career 200-yard rushing game and matched his career best for rushing touchdowns. Robinson became one of only three Wolverines players to register three or more 200-yard rushing games in program history. Mike Hart (2004–07) holds the record with five, while Ron Johnson (1966–68) also has three.  Robinson passed Illinois' Isiah Williams to move into the second spot among the Big Ten Conference's career leaders in rushing yards by a quarterback. Robinson earned Big Ten Conference Co-Offensive Player of the Week recognition.

vs. Minnesota

Sources:
    
    
    
    
    
    
    
    
    
    

In its first game of the Big Ten season, Michigan hosted the Minnesota Golden Gophers for the Little Brown Jug. Michigan won the previous meeting between the two schools in 2008 29–6.

Michigan dominated in all aspects of the game and defeated Minnesota 58–0. In the first quarter Vincent Smith ran in a three-yard touchdown, which was followed by a Denard Robinson nine-yard touchdown run. In the second quarter Drew Dileo caught a 17-yard pass from Vincent Smith, which was followed by a Vincent Smith 28-yard touchdown reception, his second touchdown of the game. Michigan's next scoring play came on a 25-yard field goal by Brendan Gibbons. Just before halftime, Kevin Koger caught an 18-yard pass for a touchdown. After the break, Fitzgerald Touissant rushed for a one-yard touchdown. Next came two more field goals from Gibbons: first from 32 yards, then in the fourth quarter from 38 yards. Michigan scored its final points when Courtney Avery picked up a Minnesota fumble and ran it back 83 yards for a touchdown.

The game was Michigan's first shutout of a Big Ten opponent since a 20–0 win at Penn State on October 6, 2001, and its first shutout of any opponent since a 38–0 win against Notre Dame on September 15, 2007. The 58–0 win over the Golden Gophers was Michigan's largest margin of victory over Minnesota in the series' history. The previous best was 51 (58–7) in 1993. The game also marked Michigan's largest margin of victory over any opponent since a 69–0 victory over Northwestern in October 1975. (Michigan also defeated Indiana by an identical 58–0 score in October 2000.) Vincent Smith became the first running back in FBS to pass for a touchdown and have touchdowns rushing and receiving since C. J. Spiller on November 14, 2009, against North Carolina State. He is the fifth Big Ten player to do so since 1996 and the first since Mike Kafka, who accomplished the feat for Northwestern on September 19, 2009. Michigan outgained Minnesota 580 to 177. Minnesota's total yardage was the lowest allowed by Michigan since the game against Minnesota in 2008. Michigan rushed for 363 yards of offense, its third straight game of rushing for more than 300 yards. This is the first time this has occurred since the 1987 season.

at Northwestern

Sources:

After the battle for the Little Brown Jug, Michigan traveled to Evanston, Illinois, for the first time since 2007 to play the Northwestern Wildcats. During the previous meeting between the schools in 2008, Northwestern won 21–14.

Michigan scored 28 unanswered points to erase a ten-point deficit and defeat Northwestern 42–24. Michigan scored first on a nine-yard reception by Steve Watsdon. Northwestern replied with a 15-yard touchdown run by Kain Colter, and then took the lead on a seven-yard run by Treyvon Green. In the second quarter, Michigan's Jeremy Gallon caught a 25-yard touchdown reception. The Wildcats responded with a two-yard touchdown run by Adonis Smith, and scored their final points of the game with a 20-yard field goal by Jeff Budzien. Michigan dominated the second half with four unanswered touchdowns. In the third quarter, Denard Robinson scored on a two-yard run, then Devin Gardner scored on a one-yard run. In the fourth quarter, Michael Shaw scored on a two-yard run, and Denard Robinson capped the victory with a five-yard run.

Michigan's 541 yard offensive performance was the second straight week the offense gained more than 500 yards of offense, and was the second highest total of the season, only beaten by the previous week's total of 581 yards against Minnesota. Denard Robinson's 337 yards of passing were one yard shy of his career high; he threw for 338 yards against Notre Dame on September 10, 2011. Michigan started a season 6–0 for the first time since 2006. Jordan Kovacs had two solo tackles for a loss, both on fourth down. Brady Hoke's 6–0 start was the first 6–0 start by a first-year Michigan coach since Bennie Oosterbaan did so in 1948.

at Michigan State

Sources:

After its game against Northwestern, Michigan traveled to East Lansing to battle their in-state rival, the Michigan State Spartans, for the Paul Bunyan Trophy. Michigan was searching for its first win against Michigan State since 2007. Michigan State won the previous meeting 34–17. The Wolverines wore legacy road uniforms for the game with Michigan State, which were the road version of the uniform worn against Notre Dame. It was the first time that Michigan wore all white road uniforms since the 1976 Orange Bowl against Oklahoma. Michigan State also wore special alternate uniforms colored dark green, bronze and black.

Michigan State continued its recent dominance over Michigan, winning 28–14. The first half was relatively quiet, with each team only scoring one touchdown in the first quarter. Michigan's Denard Robinson ran in one from 15 yards out, with Michigan State responding with a one-yard touchdown run by Edwin Baker. After halftime, State's Kirk Cousins threw a 10-yard touchdown pass to Keshawn Martin to take the lead. The Spartans added more points with another touchdown catch by Martin, this one from 13 yards out. In the fourth quarter, Michigan scored their only points of the second half with a 34-yard touchdown catch and run by Roy Roundtree. State sealed their victory with a 39-yard interception return touchdown by Isaiah Lewis, handing Michigan their first loss of the season.

The game was Michigan's first against a ranked opponent in the 2011 season. Michigan's record against Michigan State in the overall series dropped to 68–35–2, while its record in games involving the Paul Bunyan Trophy dropped to 35–23–2. Denard Robinson's passing performance put him over 4,000 yards in his career, the 10th Michigan quarterback to do so, and his rushing performance moved him past Tim Biakabutuka for 10th place. Punter Will Hagerup placed four of his seven punts inside Michigan State's 20-yard line, and three of those inside the 15-yard line. The victory was Michigan State's fourth in a row against Michigan, the first time Michigan State had done this since a streak between 1959 and 1962.

vs. Purdue

Sources:
    
    
    
    
    
    
    
    
    

Following its trip to East Lansing and its bye week, Michigan hosted the Purdue Boilermakers for its homecoming game. During the previous meeting between the two schools, Michigan defeated Purdue 27–16 in a turnover filled game caused by heavy rain. The game ball was delivered via jet pack, as Michigan's homecoming theme for the year was space.

Michigan defeated Purdue 36–14. Purdue scored its only points of the first half when Caleb TerBush threw a 48-yard touchdown pass to Gary Bush. Michigan dominated the game following the Purdue score. The Wolverines responded to Purdue's touchdown with a touchdown of their own, a two-yard run by Denard Robinson, which was its fifth consecutive opening drive touchdown. In the second quarter, Michigan scored a safety when Mike Martin tackled Caleb TerBush in the end zone. A few minutes later, Michigan's Brendan Gibbons kicked a 37-yard field goal. Michigan added more points with a two-yard touchdown run by Fitzgerald Toussaint. The final score of the first half was a 22-yard Michigan field goal with no time left on the clock. After the intermission, Michigan scored the only points of the third quarter when Fitzgerald Toussaint scored his second touchdown of the game, this time on a 59-yard rush. The teams traded scores in the final quarter. First Michigan's Michael Shaw ran in a touchdown from 37 yards out, which was followed by Purdue's Robert Marve throwing a 19-yard touchdown pass to O.J. Ross. With the win, Michigan's record against Purdue improved to 43–14.

Junior quarterback Denard Robinson completed 9-of-14 passes for 170 yards and carried the ball 15 times for 63 yards and a touchdown. He scored his 29th career rushing touchdown on a two-yard run midway through the first quarter. Robinson moved to ninth place among Michigan's all-time leaders in the category, where he is tied with Butch Woolfolk (1978–81). Robinson has scored at least one rushing touchdown in seven straight games. Fitzgerald Toussaint recorded career highs in carries (20) and rushing yards (170) and matched a career best with two rushing touchdowns. Toussaint's second touchdown—a 59-yard rush in the third quarter—was the longest rush for a touchdown of his career, but missed his overall career long by two yards (61 yards vs. Bowling Green, September 25, 2010). The Apollo 15 flight crew, which consisted of all Michigan graduates, was honored during the first quarter.

at Iowa

Sources:

    
    
    
    
    
    

For its ninth game, Michigan traveled to Iowa City to meet the Iowa Hawkeyes. Iowa won the 2010 game, 38–28.

Iowa defeated Michigan 24–16 after Michigan was unable to score a touchdown from the three-yard line at the end of the game. Iowa scored first with a four-yard touchdown run by Marcus Coker. Michigan responded with a five-yard touchdown catch by Fitzgerald Toussaint, their only points of the first half; however, the extra point was botched due to a bad snap. In the second quarter, Iowa's Brad Herman caught a one-yard pass from James Vandenberg for a touchdown. Iowa's Mike Meyer then kicked a 42-yard field goal to add to the Hawkeyes' lead. After halftime, Michigan's Brendan Gibbons scored the only points of the 3rd quarter with a 32-yard field goal. Iowa then scored its only points of the second half when Marcus Coker scored his second touchdown of the day, this time with a 13-yard rush. Michigan responded with a seven-yard touchdown catch by Kevin Koger.

Junior Hemingway had 64 yards on five catches to pass Adrian Arrington and take over 20th place with 1,453 career yards. Fitzgerald Toussaint made his first career touchdown reception on just the third catch of his career. Denard Robinson moved to ninth place all-time on the Michigan career rushing yards list, with his then total of 2,933 yards surpassing Gordon Bell's total of 2,900 yards.

at Illinois

Sources:

    
    
    
    
    
    

Following its trip to Iowa, Michigan played on the road for the second consecutive week against the Illinois Fighting Illini. In 2010, the Wolverines and Illini had played in the highest combined scoring game in Michigan Stadium history, with Michigan prevailing 67–65 in triple overtime.

Michigan dominated the game, defeating Illinois 31–14. Michigan scored two touchdowns in the first half. Fitzgerald Toussaint ran for 121 yards in the first quarter, including a 65-yard run on the second play of the game to set up a nine-yard touchdown run by Denard Robinson. In the second quarter, Robinson scored his second rushing touchdown of the game on a two-yard run. Michigan lost another scoring opportunity in the second quarter after tight end Kevin Koger gained 40 yards on a pass from Robinson. Robinson ran for an apparent touchdown from the eight-yard line, but the call was reversed when replay officials ruled that Robinson had stepped out of bounds at the two-yard line. On fourth down from the one-yard line, Robinson was stopped after a low snap slowed his momentum. A fumble by Robinson ended another drive, and Brendan Gibbons missed a 38-yard field goal with one minute left in the half. Michigan's defense held Illinois to 30 total yards in the first half. In the third quarter, Gibbons kicked a 27-yard field goal, but Illinois responded with a touchdown on a one-yard run by Nathan Scheelhaase. Denard Robinson left the game in the third quarter after sustaining a blow to his wrist. In the fourth quarter, J.T. Floyd intercepted a Scheelhaase pass and returned it 43 yards into Illinois territory. Shortly thereafter, backup quarterback Devin Gardner threw a 27-yard touchdown pass to Martavious Odoms to put Michigan ahead 24–7. Illinois closed the gap to 24–14 on an 18-play drive capped by a one-yard touchdown run by Jason Ford. After the touchdown, the Illini attempted an onside kick, but Michigan recovered, and Toussaint ran 27 yards for Michigan's fourth and final touchdown.

Michigan's defense forced three turnovers, sacked the Illinois quarterback four times, and held Illinois' offense to 37 rushing yards on 33 attempts for an average of 1.1 yards per carry. Mike Martin led the defense with nine tackles. After the game, Michigan's defensive coordinator Greg Mattison became emotional as he told reporters: "That was a Michigan defense. ... Nobody knows what went on inside of these guys and for them to stick together and to play like they played tonight, and like they have tried in every game, it says a lot about them." Defensive end Ryan Van Bergen, who recorded 2.5 sacks, three tackles for loss and seven tackles overall, was named the Big Ten's Co-Defensive Player of the Week. Toussaint's 65-yard touchdown run and his total of 192 rushing yards were career highs.

vs. Nebraska

Sources:
    
    
    
    
    
    
    
    
    
    

In the penultimate game of the 2011 regular season, Michigan hosted the Nebraska Cornhuskers, competing in their first season as a member of the Big Ten Conference and appearing in Michigan Stadium for the first time since 1962.  The teams had last met in the 2005 Alamo Bowl, which Nebraska won 32–28.  In celebration of Military Appreciation Day, Michigan held a card stunt and had a flyover of four F-16 fighter jets prior to kickoff, and the Wolverines wore American flag patches on their jerseys. Michigan also honored former head coach Lloyd Carr at the game.

Michigan dominated Nebraska, winning 45–17. Michigan took an early lead when Jeremy Gallon caught a six-yard touchdown pass and then added three more points when Brendan Gibbons kicked a 42-yard field goal.  Late in the first quarter, Nebraska narrowed the gap when Brandon Kinnie caught a 54-yard touchdown pass from Taylor Martinez. In the second quarter, each team scored once.  The Cornhuskers' Brett Maher kicked a 51-yard field goal, and Denard Robinson responded with a 14-yard touchdown run. Michigan led 17–10 at halftime.  At the start of the third quarter, Nebraska's Kenny Bell fumbled while returning the opening kickoff, and Michigan recovered the ball.  The turnover led to a one-yard touchdown run by Denard Robinson.  Fitzgerald Toussaint also scored on a one-yard touchdown run in the third quarter.  Later in the third quarter, Nebraska closed the gap to 31–17 on a three-yard touchdown run by Ameer Abdullah. Josh Furman also blocked a punt in the third quarter, the first punt block by Michigan since 2009.  In the fourth quarter, Michigan outscored Nebraska 14–0 with a 38-yard touchdown catch by Martavious Odoms and a 31-yard run by Toussaint.

Michigan's defense held Nebraska to three successful conversions on 13 third downs.  The Wolverines ran 80 plays in the game and maintained possession for 41 minutes and 13 seconds during the 60 minutes of play. Denard Robinson was honored for the sixth time in his career as the Big Ten's Offensive Player of the Week, having run for two touchdowns, passed for two more, and accounted for 263 yard of total offense (180 passing yards and 83 rushing yards), more than the entire Nebraska team.  Michigan improved to 4–2–1 in its all-time series against Nebraska.

vs. Ohio State

Sources:
    
    
    
    
    
    
    
    
    
    
    
    
    

The Wolverines completed the regular season at home with the 108th Michigan–Ohio State rivalry game against the Ohio State Buckeyes. Ohio State won the 2010 game 37–7, but later vacated the win as part of its self-imposed sanctions after it was discovered that five players had received improper benefits and had played while ineligible. This was the first time the schools met with both having head coaches in their first season since 1929, when Harry Kipke became the head coach at Michigan and Sam Willaman became the head coach at Ohio State.

Michigan defeated Ohio State for the first time in eight years, winning 40–34. Ohio State took the lead in the first quarter when Corey Brown caught a 54-yard touchdown pass from Braxton Miller. Michigan tied it up when Denard Robinson ran 41 yards for a touchdown and took the lead when Ohio State's Mike Adams committed a holding penalty in the end zone for a safety.  Michigan extended its lead to 16–7 when Junior Hemingway caught a 26-yard pass for a touchdown. In the second quarter, Ohio State's Drew Basil completed a 45-yard field goal, and the Buckeyes took a 17–16 lead when Braxton Miller ran 19 yards for a touchdown. Michigan regained the lead on a six-yard touchdown run by Denard Robinson. Ohio State responded with a 43-yard touchdown pass to DeVier Posey and led 24–23 at halftime.  In the third quarter, Martavious Odoms scored for Michigan on a 20-yard touchdown pass. After a muffed punt by Michigan's Will Hagerup at the end of the third quarter, Drew Basil kicked a 21-yard field goal early in the fourth quarter. Michigan responded with a four-yard touchdown catch by Kevin Koger, and Daniel Herron ran for an Ohio State touchdown from four yards out.  Michigan scored the final points of the game on a career-long 43-yard field goal by Brendan Gibbons. The Wolverines sealed the victory when Courtney Avery intercepted a Braxton Miller pass with 39 seconds remaining.

Denard Robinson completed 14 of 17 passes for 167 yards and three touchdowns and rushed for 170 yards and two touchdowns. He became the first Michigan player in the modern era to score two rushing and two passing touchdowns in consecutive games. Fitzgerald Toussaint also rushed for 120 yards to pass the 1,000 yard mark, giving the Wolverines a duo of 1,000-yard rushers for the first time since 1975 when Gordon Bell and Rob Lytle accomplished the feat. The Wolverines improved to 58–44–6 in the all-time series against the Buckeyes.  With the victory, Michigan also concluded its first undefeated season at home since 2006, along with its first ever eight win season at home. Brady Hoke became the second Michigan head coach to win 10 games in his first season, with the first being Fielding Yost.

vs. Virginia Tech

Sources:
    
    
    
    
    
    
    
    
    
    

On December 4, Michigan was selected to play in the Sugar Bowl against the Virginia Tech Hokies. It was Michigan's first BCS bowl game since the 2006 season, when Michigan was defeated by the USC Trojans in the 2007 Rose Bowl. The meeting between the Hokies and the Wolverines was the first between the two schools. Virginia Tech was forced to use its third-string kicker during the game, as first-string kicker Cody Journell was suspended for the game as a result of an arrest for breaking-and-entering, while second-string kicker Tyler Weiss was suspended from the game and sent home for missing curfew.

Virginia Tech dominated the majority of the first half. In the first quarter, Virginia Tech's third-string kicker Justin Myer kicked a 37-yard field goal, which was the only scoring play of the quarter. Myer added a 43-yard field goal in the second quarter. At the end of the half, however, Denard Robinson threw a 45-yard touchdown pass to Junior Hemingway to give Michigan a 7–6 lead and on the ensuing kickoff, Michigan's J.B. Fitzgerald forced a fumble, which Michigan recovered. Michigan's Brendan Gibbons kicked a 24-yard field goal as time expired. In the third quarter, Michigan scored another touchdown on a Denard Robinson to Junior Hemingway pass, this time from 18 yards out. This scoring drive followed an interception by linebacker Frank Clark. Virginia Tech responded with another Justin Myer field goal, this time from 36 yards away. In the fourth quarter, Virginia Tech's quarterback Logan Thomas trimmed Michigan's lead to two points, and then promptly tied the game throwing a successful two-point conversion to Marcus Davis. Michigan responded with a 39-yard Brendan Gibbons field goal, but Virginia Tech tied the game with two seconds remaining via a 25-yard field goal by Myer. In overtime, Virginia Tech seemingly scored the go-ahead touchdown on a Logan Thomas to Danny Coale pass, but video review overturned the play. The next play saw Myer miss a 37-yard field goal. Michigan received the ball and saw Gibbons kick the game-winning 37-yard field goal.

The game was Michigan's fifth BCS bowl appearance. With the victory, Michigan won the only BCS bowl that it had not yet won, improved its bowl record to 20–21, and improved its record against the ACC to 19–3. Michigan also moved to 2–0 in overtime in bowl games, with the previous victory coming in the 2000 Orange Bowl. Hemingway, who caught both Michigan touchdowns, was named the Sugar Bowl MVP. Brady Hoke became the eighth coach to lead a team to a BCS bowl and third to win a BCS bowl in his first season.

Depth chart
Starters and backups.

Captains/Co-Captains
Season Captains
Kevin Koger (TE-#86), David Molk (C-#50), and Michael Martin (DT-#68)

Game Co-Captains
Zachary Johnson (S-#36)-Michigan vs. Michigan State University on October 15, 2011
Jared VanSlyke (DB-#31)-Michigan vs. Virginia Tech on December 4, 2012

Awards and honors
At the conclusion of the season, several Wolverines players and coaches received national and/or conference honors. David Molk received the Rimington Trophy as the best center in college football. He was also a consensus All-American, receiving first-team honors from the Associated Press, Football Writers Association of America, Scout.com, Sporting News, and the Walter Camp Football Foundation. Molk also received the inaugural Rimington–Pace Big Ten Offensive Lineman of the Year award.

Brady Hoke won the Hayes–Schembechler Coach of the Year, as selected by conference coaches, and the Dave McClain Coach of the Year, as picked by the media.  Hoke was also a finalist for national coach of the year honors in the Bear Bryant Award, Liberty Mutual Coach of the Year Award, and Eddie Robinson Coach of the Year award.  Defensive coordinator Greg Mattison was selected as one of five finalists for the 2011 Broyles Award.

Three Michigan players received second-team All-Big Ten honors: (1) Mike Martin by both the coaches and the media, (2) Denard Robinson by the media, and (3) Taylor Lewan by the coaches.  Lewan also received honorable mention All-American recognition by the Pro Football Weekly, and Robinson received the same recognition from Sports Illustrated.  Jake Ryan, Desmond Morgan, Matt Wile and Blake Countess all earned 2011 Big Ten All-Freshman team recognition from both ESPN.com and BTN.com, while Ryan, Morgan and Countess earned 2011 College Football News All-Freshman honorable mention honors as well. Countess was also a Sporting News All-Freshman selection, while Ryan was a second team Rivals.com All-Freshman selection. Safety Jordan Kovacs was named a quarterfinalist for the Lott Trophy and a semifinalist for the 2011 Burlsworth Trophy. He also received the Big Ten Sportsmanship Award for the Michigan program.

Several Michigan players were invited to post-season all-star games: Junior Hemingway Kevin Koger to the 2012 East–West Shrine Game, David Molk and Mike Martin to the 2012 Senior Bowl, Michael Shaw to the Casino del Sol All-Star Game, Marell Evans to the NFLPA Collegiate Bowl, and Martavious Odoms to the Battle of Florida All-Star Game.

Statistics
Michigan finished the season ranked third in the Big Ten in total offense and second in scoring offense.  Defensively, the team improved dramatically finishing fourth in total defense in the Big Ten and 17th in the country.

Denard Robinson led the Big Ten in total offense for the second consecutive year and finished fifth in the conference in rushing with an average of 90.46 rushing yards per game.  Jeremy Gallon finished third in the conference with an average of 10.11 yards per punt return.  Kenny Demens led the team in tackles with 7.23 per game.
The per game team rankings below include 120 Football Bowl Subdivision teams and 12 Big Ten Conference teams.

The per game rankings below include players who played in 75% of teams' games and were ranked in the top 100 national leaders and top 25 conference leaders:

Roster

2012 NFL Draft

Three Michigan players (Mike Martin, Junior Hemingway and David Molk) were invited to the 2012 NFL Scouting Combine.  The 2012 NFL Draft was held in late April.  Martin was drafted 82nd overall by the Tennessee Titans; Molk was drafted 226th by the San Diego Chargers; and Hemingway 238th by the Kansas City Chiefs. Prior to the draft, the Houston Texans informed Ryan Van Bergen that they were targeting him with their sixth round pick. However, the team drafted two defensive linemen in earlier rounds (Whitney Mercilus and Jared Crick) and did not pick Van Bergen; he subsequently signed with the Carolina Panthers, minutes after the draft ended on April 28.  Later that day, Troy Woolfolk and Michael Shaw announced via Twitter through their agents that they had signed with the Dallas Cowboys and Washington Redskins, respectively.  Seniors J.B. Fitzgerald (linebacker) and Will Heininger (defensive lineman) announced that they did not intend to pursue careers playing professional football.  Toney Clemons, who had previously transferred from Michigan to Colorado was drafted in the seventh round.

References

External links

 2011 Wolverines at NCAA.org

Michigan
Michigan Wolverines football seasons
Sugar Bowl champion seasons
Michigan Wolverines football